= Sulaimani Public Library =

Sulaimani Public Library is a library located on Salim Street in Sulaimani. The first culture was created through the sicochkai of the Babans (Nali, Salim, Kurdi) who spread the message of culture and the Babans paid great attention to books and collected them in the Sulaimani Public Library For 76 years, he has illuminated the brightness of books and activities in this city.
